Hendriksen Strait is a natural waterway through the Canadian Arctic Archipelago in the territory of Nunavut. It separates Amund Ringnes Island (to the north) from Cornwall Island (to the south). To the east, the sound opens into Norwegian Bay.

Bibliography 

 

Straits of Qikiqtaaluk Region